Jamie Osborne may refer to:
 Jamie Osborne (jockey), English racehorse trainer and former jockey
 Jamie Osborne (rugby union), Irish rugby union player

See also
 James Osborne (disambiguation)